is a Japanese novel self-publishing website created by . It was launched on April 2, 2004. Users can upload their novels free of charge and the novels are also free to read. As of December 2022, the site hosts close to 1,000,000 novels, has over 2,300,000 registered users and it receives over 1 billion page views per month.

Over one hundred novel series uploaded to the site have been acquired by various publishers, such as Log Horizon, serialized from 2010 before being acquired by Enterbrain in 2011, and The Irregular at Magic High School, which was serialized between 2008 and 2011 before being acquired by ASCII Media Works.

Futabasha's light novel imprint Monster Bunko was established on July 30, 2014, which exclusively publishes series that originated on Shōsetsuka ni Narō.

Selected works
7th Time Loop (2020–ongoing) by Touko Amekawa - acquired by Overlap, received a manga adaptation
A Herbivorous Dragon of 5,000 Years Gets Unfairly Villainized (2017–2020) by Kaisei Enomoto - acquired by Kadokawa Shoten, received a manga adaptation and an original net animation adaptation
A Playthrough of a Certain Dude's VRMMO Life (2012–2016, moved to AlphaPolis) by Shiina Howahowa - acquired by AlphaPolis, received a manga adaptation and an anime television series adaptation
Accomplishments of the Duke's Daughter (2015–2017) by Reia - acquired by Fujimi Shobo, received a manga adaptation
Alya Sometimes Hides Her Feelings in Russian (2020) by SunSunSun - acquired by Kadokawa Shoten, received a manga adaptation and an anime television series adaptation
Am I Actually the Strongest? (2018–ongoing) by Sai Sumimori - acquired by Kodansha, received a manga adaptation and an anime television series adaptation
Apparently, Disillusioned Adventurers Will Save the World (2019–ongoing) by Shinta Fuji - acquired by Media Factory, received a manga adaptation and an anime television series adaptation
Arifureta: From Commonplace to World's Strongest (2013–ongoing) by Ryo Shirakome - acquired by Overlap, received several manga adaptations, a prequel light novel series, and an anime television series adaptation
As a Reincarnated Aristocrat, I'll Use My Appraisal Skill to Rise in the World (2019–ongoing) by Miraijin A - acquired by Kodansha, received a manga adaptation
Ascendance of a Bookworm (2013–2017) by Miya Kazuki - acquired by TO Books, received several manga adaptations and an anime television series adaptation
Banished from the Hero's Party (2017–ongoing) by Zappon - acquired by Kadokawa Shoten, received a manga adaptation and an anime television series adaptation
Beast Tamer (2018–ongoing) by Suzu Miyama - acquired by Kodansha, received a manga adaptation and an anime television series adaptation
Berserk of Gluttony (2017–2022, moved to Kakuyomu) by Ichika Isshiki - acquired by Micro Magazine, received a manga adaptation and an anime television series adaptation
Bibliophile Princess (2015–2022) by Yui - acquired by Ichijinsha, received a manga adaptation and an anime television series adaptation
Black Summoner (2014–ongoing) by Doufu Mayoi - acquired by Overlap, received a manga adaptation and an anime television series adaptation
Bofuri (2016–ongoing) by Yuumikan - acquired by Fujimi Shobo, received a manga adaptation and an anime television series adaptation
By the Grace of the Gods (2014–ongoing) by Roy - acquired by Hobby Japan, received a manga adaptation and an anime television series adaptation
Campfire Cooking in Another World with My Absurd Skill (2016–ongoing) by Ren Eguchi - acquired by Overlap, received a manga adaptation, a spin-off manga, and an anime television series adaptation
Chillin' in Another World with Level 2 Super Cheat Powers (2016–2019) by Miya Kinojo - acquired by Overlap, received a manga adaptation
Chillin' in My 30s After Getting Fired from the Demon King's Army (2018–2020) by Rokujūyon Okazawa - acquired by Kodansha, received a manga adaptation and an anime television series adaptation
Chronicles of an Aristocrat Reborn in Another World (2016–ongoing) by Yashu - acquired by Hifumi Shobō, received a manga adaptation and an anime television series adaptation
Combatants Will Be Dispatched! (2012) by Natsume Akatsuki - acquired by Kadokawa Shoten, received a manga adaptation and an anime television series adaptation
Cooking with Wild Game (2014–ongoing) by EDA - acquired by Hobby Japan, received a manga adaptation
Dahlia in Bloom (2018–ongoing) by Hisaya Amagishi - acquired by Media Factory, received two manga adaptations
Death March to the Parallel World Rhapsody (2013–ongoing) by Hiro Ainana - acquired by Fujimi Shobo, received a manga adaptation and an anime television series adaptation
Demon Lord, Retry! (2016–ongoing) by Kurone Kanzaki - acquired by Futabasha, received a manga adaptation and an anime television series adaptation
Didn't I Say to Make My Abilities Average in the Next Life?! (2016–ongoing) by FUNA - acquired by Earth Star Entertainment, received a manga adaptation and an anime television series adaptation
Drugstore in Another World (2016–2020) by Kennoji - acquired by Linda Publishers (formerly) and Hifumi Shobō, received a manga adaptation and an anime television series adaptation
Endo and Kobayashi Live! The Latest on Tsundere Villainess Lieselotte (2018–2019, later on Kakuyomu) by Suzu Enoshima - acquired by Fujimi Shobo, received a manga adaptation and an anime television series adaptation
Failure Frame (2017–ongoing) by Kaoru Shinozaki - acquired by Overlap, received a manga adaptation
Farming Life in Another World (2016–ongoing) by Kinosuke Naito - acquired by Enterbrain, received a manga adaptation and an anime television series adaptation
Harem in the Labyrinth of Another World (2011–2019) by Shachi Sogano - acquired by Shufunotomo, received a manga adaptation and an anime television series adaptation
Hazure Skill (2018–ongoing) by Kennoji - acquired by Fujimi Shobo, received a manga adaptation
How a Realist Hero Rebuilt the Kingdom (2014–2016, moved to Pixiv) by Dojyomaru - acquired by Overlap, received a manga adaptation and an anime television series adaptation
I Kept Pressing the 100-Million Button and Came Out on Top (2019–ongoing) by Shuichi Tsukishima - acquired by Fujimi Shobo, received a manga adaptation
I Shall Survive Using Potions! (2015–ongoing) by FUNA - acquired by Kodansha, received two manga adaptations, a spin-off manga, and an anime television series adaptation
I Want to Eat Your Pancreas (2014) by Yoru Sumino - acquired by Futabasha, received a manga adaptation, a live-action film adaptation, and an anime film adaptation
I Was Reincarnated as the 7th Prince so I Can Take My Time Perfecting My Magical Ability (2019–ongoing) by Kenkyo na Circle - acquired by Kodansha, received a manga adaptation and an anime television series adaptation
I'm Giving the Disgraced Noble Lady I Rescued a Crash Course in Naughtiness (2019–present) - acquired by Shufu to Seikatsu Sha, received a manga adaptation and an anime television series adaptation
I'm in Love with the Villainess (2018–2021) by Inori - acquired by Aichu Publishing and Ichijinsha, received a manga adaptation and an anime television series adaptation
I'm the Villainess, So I'm Taming the Final Boss (2017–2019) by Sarasa Nagase - acquired by Kadokawa Shoten, received a manga adaptation and an anime television series adaptation
I've Been Killing Slimes for 300 Years and Maxed Out My Level (2016–2021) by Kisetsu Morita - acquired by SB Creative, received a manga adaptation, several spin-off light novels, and an anime television series adaptation
I've Somehow Gotten Stronger When I Improved My Farm-Related Skills (2016–2018) by Shobonnu - acquired by Futabasha, received a manga adaptation and an anime television series adaptation
If It's for My Daughter, I'd Even Defeat a Demon Lord (2014–2017) by Chirolu - acquired by Hobby Japan, received a manga adaptation and an anime television series adaptation
In Another World with My Smartphone (2013–ongoing) by Patora Fuyuhara - acquired by Hobby Japan, received a manga adaptation and an anime television series adaptation
In the Land of Leadale (2010–2012) by Ceez - acquired by Enterbrain, received a manga adaptation and an anime television series adaptation
Infinite Dendrogram (2015–ongoing) by Sakon Kaidō - acquired by Hobby Japan, received a manga adaptation and an anime television series adaptation
Isekai Cheat Magician (2012–ongoing) by Takeru Uchida - acquired by Shufunotomo, received a manga adaptation and an anime television series adaptation
Isekai de Mofumofu Nadenade Suru Tameni Ganbattemasu (2012–ongoing) by Himawari - acquired by Futabasha, received a manga adaptation and an anime television series adaptation
Isekai Izakaya "Nobu" (2012–ongoing) by Natsuya Semikawa - acquired by Takarajimasha, received a manga adaptation, an original net animation adaptation, and a live-action drama adaptation
Isekai Shōkan wa Nidome Desu (2015–2016) by Kazuha Kishimoto - acquired by Futabasha, received a manga adaptation and an anime television series adaptation
Ishura (2017–ongoing, also on Kakuyomu) by Keiso - acquired by ASCII Media Works, received a manga adaptation and an anime television series adaptation
JK Haru is a Sex Worker in Another World (2016–2017) by Kō Hiratori - acquired by Hayakawa Publishing, received a manga adaptation
Knight's & Magic (2010–ongoing) by Hisago Amazake-no - acquired by Shufunotomo, received a manga adaptation and an anime television series adaptation
KonoSuba (2012–2013) by Natsume Akatsuki - acquired by Kadokawa Shoten, received a spin-off light novel series, a manga adaptation, and an anime television series adaptation
Kuma Kuma Kuma Bear (2014–ongoing) by Kumanano - acquired by Shufu to Seikatsu Sha, received a manga adaptation and an anime television series adaptation
Log Horizon (2010–ongoing) by Mamare Touno - acquired by Enterbrain, received several manga adaptations and an anime television series adaptation
Loner Life in Another World (2016–ongoing) by Shoji Goji - acquired by Overlap, received a manga adaptation
Management of Novice Alchemist (2018–ongoing) by Mizuho Itsuki - acquired by Fujimi Shobo, received a manga adaptation and an anime television series adaptation
Mushoku Tensei (2012–2015) by Rifujin na Magonote - acquired by Media Factory, received a manga adaptation and an anime television series adaptation
My Daughter Left the Nest and Returned an S-Rank Adventurer (2017–2020) by Mojikakiya - acquired by Earth Star Entertainment, received a manga adaptation and an anime television series adaptation
My Happy Marriage by Akumi Agitogi - acquired by Fujimi Shobo, received a manga adaptation, a live-action film adaptation, and an anime television series adaptation
My Instant Death Ability Is So Overpowered, No One in This Other World Stands a Chance Against Me! (2016–2023) by Tsuyoshi Fujitaka - acquired by Earth Star Entertainment, received a manga adaptation and an anime television series adaptation
My Isekai Life (2017–2020) by Shinkoshoto - acquired by SB Creative, received a manga adaptation and an anime television series adaptation
My Next Life as a Villainess: All Routes Lead to Doom! (2014–2015) by Satoru Yamaguchi - acquired by Ichijinsha, received two manga adaptations and an anime television series adaptation
My One-Hit Kill Sister (2019–present) by Konoe - received a manga adaptation and an anime television series adaptation
My Unique Skill Makes Me OP Even at Level 1 (2017–2020) by Nazuna Miki - acquired by Kodansha, received a manga adaptation and an anime television series adaptation
New Life+: Young Again in Another World (2014–2018) by MINE - acquired by Hobby Japan, received a manga adaptation
New Saga (2012–2013) by Masayuki Abe - acquired by AlphaPolis, received a manga adaptation and an anime television series adaptation
Overlord (2012–ongoing) by Kugane Maruyama - acquired by Enterbrain, received a manga adaptation and an anime television series adaptation
Parallel World Pharmacy (2015–ongoing) by Liz Takayama - acquired by Media Factory, received a manga adaptation and an anime television series adaptation
Reborn as a Vending Machine, I Now Wander the Dungeon (2016) by Hirukuma - acquired by Kadokawa Shoten, received a manga adaptation and an anime television series adaptation
Reborn to Master the Blade: From Hero-King to Extraordinary Squire (2019–ongoing) by Hayaken – acquired by Hobby Japan, received a manga adaptation, a mini anime adaptation, and an anime television series adaptation
Record of Wortenia War (2009–ongoing) by Ryota Hori - acquired by Hobby Japan, received a manga adaptation
Redo of Healer (2016–ongoing) by Rui Tsukiyo - acquired by Kadokawa Shoten, received a manga adaptation and an anime television series adaptation
Reincarnated as a Sword (2015–ongoing) by Yuu Tanaka - acquired by Micro Magazine, received two manga adaptations and an anime television series adaptation
Restaurant to Another World (2013–ongoing) by Junpei Inuzuka - acquired by Shufunotomo, received two manga adaptations and an anime television series adaptation
Re:Zero − Starting Life in Another World (2012–ongoing) by Tappei Nagatsuki - acquired by Media Factory, received several manga adaptations and an anime television series adaptation
Roll Over and Die (2018–ongoing) by kiki - acquired by Micro Magazine, received a manga adaptation
Sasaki and Peeps (2018–ongoing, also on Kakuyomu) by Buncololi - acquired by Media Factory, received a manga adaptation and an anime television series adaptation
Saving 80,000 Gold in Another World for My Retirement (2015–present) by FUNA - acquired by Kodansha, received a manga adaptation and an anime television series adaptation
Seirei Gensouki: Spirit Chronicles (2014–2020) by Yuri Kitayama - acquired by Hobby Japan, received two manga adaptations and an anime television series adaptation
Sexiled (2018–2019) by Kaeruda Ameko - acquired by Overlap, received a manga adaptation
Shangri-La Frontier (2017–ongoing) by Katarina - received a manga adaptation and an anime television series adaptation
She Professed Herself Pupil of the Wise Man (2012–ongoing) by Hirotsugu Ryusen - acquired by Micro Magazine, received a manga adaptation and an anime television series adaptation
Skeleton Knight in Another World (2014–2018) by Ennki Hakari - acquired by Overlap, received a manga adaptation and an anime television series adaptation
So I'm a Spider, So What? (2015–2022) by Okina Baba - acquired by Fujimi Shobo, received two manga adaptations and an anime television series adaptation
Sweet Reincarnation (2015–ongoing) by Nozomu Koryu - acquired by TO Books, received a manga adaptation and an anime television series adaptation
Sword of the Demon Hunter: Kijin Gentōshō (2015–2016, moved from Arcadia) by Moto'o Nakanishi - acquired by Futabasha, received a manga adaptation and an anime adaptation
Tearmoon Empire (2018–ongoing) by Nozomu Mochitsuki - acquired by TO Books, received a manga adaptation, two stage play adaptations, and an anime television series adaptation
That Time I Got Reincarnated as a Slime (2013–2016) by Fuse - acquired by Micro Magazine, received several manga adaptations and an anime television series adaptation
There's No Way a Side Character Like Me Could Be Popular, Right? (2018–ongoing) by Sekaiichi - acquired by Overlap, received a manga adaptation
The 8th Son? Are You Kidding Me? (2013–2017) by Y.A. - acquired by Media Factory, received a manga adaptation and an anime television series adaptation
The Angel Next Door Spoils Me Rotten (2018–ongoing) by Saekisan - acquired by SB Creative, received a manga adaptation and an anime television series adaptation
The Apothecary Diaries (2011–ongoing) by Natsu Hyūga - acquired by Shufunotomo, received two manga adaptations and an anime television series adaptation
The Eminence in Shadow (2018–ongoing) by Daisuke Aizawa - acquired by Enterbrain, received two manga adaptations and an anime television series adaptation
The Faraway Paladin (2015–ongoing) by Kanata Yanagino - acquired by Overlap, received a manga adaptation and an anime television series adaptation
The Fruit of Evolution (2014–ongoing) by Miku - acquired by Futabasha, received a manga adaptation and an anime television series adaptation
The Girl I Saved on the Train Turned Out to Be My Childhood Friend (2019–2020) by Kennoji - acquired by SB Creative, received a manga adaptation
The Great Cleric (2015–2022) by Broccoli Lion - acquired by Micro Magazine, received a manga adaptation and an anime television series adaptation
The Greatest Demon Lord Is Reborn as a Typical Nobody (2017–2022) by Myōjin Katō - acquired by Fujimi Shobo, received a manga adaptation and an anime television series adaptation
The Greatest Magicmaster's Retirement Plan (2015–ongoing) by Izushiro - acquired by Hobby Japan, received two manga adaptations
The Hidden Dungeon Only I Can Enter (2017–2021) by Meguru Seto - acquired by Kodansha, received a manga adaptation and an anime television series adaptation
The Iceblade Sorcerer Shall Rule the World (2019–ongoing) by Nana Mikoshiba - acquired by Kodansha, received a manga adaptation and an anime television series adaptation
The Ideal Sponger Life (2011–ongoing) by Tsunehiko Watanabe - acquired by Shufunotomo, received a manga adaptation
The Irregular at Magic High School (2008–2011) by Tsutomu Satō - acquired by ASCII Media Works, received several manga adaptations and an anime television series adaptation
The Magical Revolution of the Reincarnated Princess and the Genius Young Lady (2019–2021) by Piero Karasu - acquired by Fujimi Shobo, received a manga adaptation and an anime television series adaptation
The Misfit of Demon King Academy (2017–ongoing) by Shu - acquired by ASCII Media Works, received a manga adaptation and an anime television series adaptation
The Most Heretical Last Boss Queen (2018–ongoing) by Tenichi - acquired by Ichijinsha, received a manga adaptation and an anime television series adaptation
The Reincarnation of the Strongest Exorcist in Another World (2018–ongoing) by Kiichi Kosuzu - acquired by Futabasha, received a manga adaptation and an anime television series adaptation
The Rising of the Shield Hero (2012–2015) by Aneko Yusagi - acquired by Media Factory, received a manga adaptation and an anime television series adaptation
The Saint's Magic Power Is Omnipotent (2016–ongoing) by Yuka Tachibana - acquired by Fujimi Shobo, received a manga adaptation and an anime television series adaptation
The Strongest Sage With the Weakest Crest (2016–2020) by Shinkoshoto - acquired by SB Creative, received a manga adaptation, a side story light novel series, and an anime television series adaptation
The Unwanted Undead Adventurer (2016–ongoing) by Yū Okano - acquired by Overlap, received a manga adaptation and an anime television series adaptation
The Weakest Tamer Began a Journey to Pick Up Trash (2018–ongoing) by Honobonoru500 - acquired by TO Books, received a manga adaptation and an anime television series adaptation
The World's Finest Assassin Gets Reincarnated in Another World as an Aristocrat (2018–2021) by Rui Tsukiyo - acquired by Kadokawa Shoten, received a manga adaptation and an anime television series adaptation
The Wrong Way to Use Healing Magic (2014–ongoing) by Kurokata - acquired by Media Factory, received a manga adaptation and an anime adaptation
Trapped in a Dating Sim: The World of Otome Games is Tough for Mobs (2017–2019) by Yomu Mishima - acquired by Micro Magazine, received a manga adaptation and an anime television series adaptation
Tsukimichi: Moonlit Fantasy (2012–2016, moved to AlphaPolis) by Kei Azumi - acquired by AlphaPolis, received a manga adaptation and an anime television series adaptation
Unnamed Memory (2012–ongoing) by Kuji Furumiya - acquired by ASCII Media Works, received a manga adaptation and an anime television series adaptation
Villainess Level 99 (2018–ongoing) by Satori Tanabata - acquired by Fujimi Shobo, received a manga adaptation
Welcome to Japan, Ms. Elf! (2017–ongoing) by Makishima Suzuki - acquired by Hobby Japan, received a manga adaptation
Wise Man's Grandchild (2015–2022) by Tsuyoshi Yoshioka - acquired by Enterbrain, received a manga adaptation and an anime television series adaptation
Yumemiru Danshi wa Genjitsushugisha (2018–ongoing) by Okemaru - acquired by Hobby Japan, received a manga adaptation and an anime television series adaptation

See also
 Isekai

References

External links

 

 
Internet properties established in 2004
Japanese literature
Otaku